Alfred Braun (13 May 1888 – 3 January 1978) was a German screenwriter, actor and film director.

Filmography

Actor
 Das Leid der Liebe (1916)
 Der Sohn der Magd (1919)
 The Gambler (1920) - Stöckel
 Rosenmontag (1924)
 The Enchantress (1924)
 Das sonnige Märchen vom Glück (1924) - Dr. Ing. Waldemar Hassenstein
 Radio Magic (1927) - Sprecher des Berliner Rundfunks
 Flachsmann the Educator (1930) - Jan Flemming
 Tingel-Tangel (1930)
 Spione im Savoy-Hotel (1932) - Alfred Braun, der rasende Reporter
 Große Freiheit Nr. 7 (1944) - Rundfunkreporter
 Chemistry and Love (1948) - Narrator
 Anonymous Letters (1949) - Dr. Maurin
 The Staircase (1950) - Kriminalkommissar
 Primanerinnen (1951) - Herr Lullus
 When the Evening Bells Ring (1951)
 Komm zurück... (1953) - Vokrodt
 Ave Maria (1953)
 Scotland Yard Hunts Dr. Mabuse (1963)

Director
 Girls Behind Bars (1949)
 The Staircase (1950)
 A Rare Lover (1950)
 Eyes of Love (1951)
 When the Evening Bells Ring (1951)
 A Thousand Red Roses Bloom (1952)
 Ave Maria (1953)
 Come Back (1953)
 Stresemann (1957)
 Schwarze Nylons – Heiße Nächte (1958)
 Morgen wirst du um mich weinen (1959)

Bibliography
 Fox, Jo. Film Propaganda in Britain and Nazi Germany: World War II Cinema. Berg, 2007.

External links

1888 births
1978 deaths
German male film actors
Mass media people from Berlin
German male silent film actors
Male actors from Berlin
20th-century German male actors
German male writers